Rosenegg is a hill in Baden-Württemberg, Germany, located 2 miles east of the town of Gottmadingen.

Mountains and hills of Baden-Württemberg